Thomas Robert Wieghaus (born February 1, 1957) is an American former catcher who played for the Montreal Expos and Houston Astros of Major League Baseball (MLB) in the 1980s.

Career
Wieghaus attended Rich East High School in Park Forest, Illinois. He was drafted in the 12th round of the 1978 Amateur Draft out of Illinois State University. He played his first season of ball for Jamestown, New York of the New York-Penn League. He also played A ball in West Palm Beach, Double A ball in Memphis, and Triple A ball in Denver.

He was hitless in his 13 big-league at-bats. He did, however, get an official RBI. Weighaus was the Astros' catcher for starting pitcher Nolan Ryan on April 15, 1984 at the Astrodome, and hit a sacrifice fly to center field in the second inning to score teammate Enos Cabell.

External links

1957 births
Living people
American expatriate baseball players in Canada
Baseball players from Illinois
Denver Bears players
Houston Astros players
Illinois State Redbirds baseball players
Jamestown Expos players
Major League Baseball catchers
Memphis Chicks players
Montreal Expos players
Oklahoma City 89ers players
People from Chicago Heights, Illinois
Sportspeople from the Chicago metropolitan area
Tucson Toros players
West Palm Beach Expos players
Wichita Aeros players